Pasi Lind (born 16 June 1961) is a Finnish judoka.

Achievements

See also
European Judo Championships
History of martial arts
List of judo techniques
List of judoka
Martial arts timeline

References

External links

1961 births
Living people
Finnish male judoka
Place of birth missing (living people)